Ebenezer Ford OBE FRSE ARCS DIC (1890–1974) was a British marine zoologist. He was generally known as Ebb Ford. He was a competent artist and created several thousand "specimen drawings". From 1924 to 1929 he conducted a major study of the British herring shoals. He was a strong supporter of the Sea-Fishing Industry Act of 1933.

Life
He was born on 22 September 1890 in Hove on the southern English coast, the son of George Horace Ford; his younger brother, Percy Ford, became an economist and was the first Professor of Economics at the University of Southampton. Ebb was educated at Varndean School then at Brighton College for two years before going to Imperial College London to study Science under Clifford Dobell. He specialised in marine zoology. He did research as a Huxley Scholar and was awarded the Sarah Marshall Exhibition in 1913. In the same year he was given the post of Assistant Naturalist at the Plymouth Laboratory.

As with many of his generation his plans were disrupted by the outbreak of the First World War. He firstly volunteered and joined the Sussex Yeomanry but then applied for an officer’s commission, and on obtaining this, in July 1915, joined the Royal Fusiliers. He saw active service in France and was wounded at the Battle of Passchendaele in 1917.

In 1919, he returned to Plymouth to resume his role as Assistant Naturalist, and was immediately promoted to Fisheries Naturalist. Remaining in Plymouth he eventually rose to be Assistant Director of the Laboratory in 1935. His career was again interrupted by the Second World War during which, after a period in the Home Guard, he served in Air Intelligence in the Air Ministry in London from November 1941. In 1949 he left Plymouth to become Director of the Marine Station at Millport, in replacement of Richard Elmhirst.

He then became first full time Secretary of the Scottish Marine Biological Association.
In 1950 he was elected a Fellow of the Royal Society of Edinburgh. His proposers were Maurice Yonge, Charles Wynford Parsons, Robert Campbell Garry, and sir James Wilfred Cook.

He retired in March 1956 and returned to his native county of Sussex, naming his house Keppel after the Keppel pier at Millport. He received the Order of the British Empire (OBE) on New Year’s Day 1957 for services to marine science. He died at the King Edward VII Hospital, Midhurst, on 14 October 1974.

Publications
Ford wrote in the Fishing News magazine under the pen-name of Quibbon

Nuclear division of the Limax Amoeba (1913)
Statistical Methods for Research Workers (1925)

Family
He married Alice Gurr in August 1916. She died in 1950. They had one daughter, Joan.

References

1890 births
1974 deaths
Fellows of the Royal Society of Edinburgh
20th-century British zoologists